Merritt is a city in the Nicola Valley of the south-central Interior of British Columbia, Canada. Situated at the confluence of the Nicola and Coldwater rivers, it is the first major community encountered after travelling along Phase One of the Coquihalla Highway and acts as the gateway to all other major highways to the B.C. Interior. The city developed in 1893 when part of the ranches owned by William Voght, Jesus Garcia, and John Charters were surveyed for a town site.

Once known as Forksdale, the community adopted its current name in 1906 in honour of mining engineer and railway promoter William Hamilton Merritt III. The  city limits consist of the community, a number of civic parks, historical sites, an aquatic centre, a local arena, a public library (which is a branch of the Thompson-Nicola Regional District Library System) and a civic centre. Merritt has dozens of bronzed hand prints of country music stars who have been in the city for the annual Merritt Mountain Music Festival displayed throughout town. Merritt is also home to a local radio station, a weekly newspaper and the Nicola Valley Institute of Technology campus. Nearby, there are four provincial parks, numerous lakes, and several recreational trails. Merritt is known as the "Country Music Capital of Canada" for its wealth of country music attractions, activities, and events.

Highway 5, and Highway 97C intersect at Merritt with Highway 97C East connecting the city to Kelowna and Penticton, Highway 97C Northwest to Logan Lake, Highway 8 to Spences Bridge and Lillooet, Highway 5A South to Princeton, Highway 5A North to Kamloops, Highway 5 South to Hope, and Highway 5 North to Kamloops. Merritt's economy is dominated by the primary industries of forestry, tourism, and service.

History 

For years, the Merritt area was a gathering place for local European colonists and First Nations, as the area was a focus of transportation routes used by early pioneers. The grasslands eventually drew the attention of settlers interested in ranching, and the first ranches were staked in the mid-19th century.

In the 1880s three ranches located at the confluence of the Nicola and Coldwater Rivers, owned by William Voght, Jesus Garcia, and the John Charters Estate, became the focus of a farming community known as "The Forks". With the completion of the Canadian Pacific Railway through British Columbia in 1885, interest increased in the coal deposits south of The Forks.

Parts of the ranches owned by Voght, Garcia and Charters were surveyed in 1893 for the townsite of Forksdale, but the name did not catch on with locals. Instead, the name was changed in 1906 to honour William Hamilton Merritt III, a mining engineer and railway promoter. By 1907, the coal mines were in operation and with the completion of the railway from Spences Bridge, government and other offices starting moving from Lower and Upper Nicola to establish Merritt as the major settlement in the Nicola Valley.

Armstrong's Store moved from Lower Nicola to Nicola Avenue in Merritt in the spring of 1907. G.B. Armstrong became Merritt's first postmaster at this location in 1908. In 1910, Armstrong's Department Store moved to 2025 Quilchena Avenue. In 1909, the Bank of Montreal moved from the settlement of Nicola to Merritt. A.E. Howse moved his department store to the west end of Nicola Avenue. The Nicola Herald, founded at Nicola Lake in 1905, moved from Nicola to Merritt in 1909 and the name was changed to the Merritt Herald and Nicola Valley Advocate. Other industries developed in the Valley, including ranching, copper, nickel, gold and silver mining, and forestry, and as a result, new business buildings were constructed.

The move toward incorporation began in 1910 and culminated on April 1, 1911, when Merritt was granted its city charter. The first Merritt City Hall was built in 1912. The top floor was police headquarters, the second for administration offices, and the bottom for the jail. The building included the fire hall and tower that housed a whistle to summon the volunteer fire fighters.

Merritt dedicated the names of its streets and avenues to early settlers. Among the names honoured were Charters, Chapman, Cleasby, Garcia, Voght, Coutlee, Nicola, Granite, and Quilchena.

As the town grew, it featured a drug store, a general store, a brewery and a jewellery store. The first electrical power service by the city was provided in February 1913.

Merritt and the Nicola Valley experienced prosperity until the passage of restrictive trade legislation in the United States in 1930. Because the city had financially backed one of the major sawmills, the loss of lumber markets caused the city to go into receivership from 1933 to 1952.

The next wave of immigrants, primarily Sikh, from the Punjab region of India, arrived in Merritt in the 1950s, followed by a large influx in the late 1960s and early 1970s to work in the booming forestry sector of the time and adding to the cultural mosaic of Merritt. Known as Indo-Canadians, they continue to play a crucial part in the economy—Aspen Planers Ltd., a major employer in the city, and many other businesses, restaurants and hotels in Merritt are owned by members of this group.

In advance polls during the 2015 Canadian elections, an unexpectedly high turnout in Merritt resulted in there being an insufficient quantity of ballots.

On November 15, 2021, the entire city was ordered to evacuate after heavy rainfall and flooding caused the municipality's wastewater treatment plant to fail. Residents were asked to shelter with family or friends outside of the community, or in emergency evacuation shelters in Kamloops and Kelowna.

Cityscape 

Merritt is composed of four distinct residential areas: Bench, Collettville, Central and Diamondvale. The Bench is a residential mountain bench, hence the name, sited on the northwest side of the valley. Collettville, on the southwest edge of the community south of the Coldwater River, was the newest addition to Merritt. Central is situated at the south of the city centre. Diamond Vale is in the heart of the valley, and is the most populated. Each area is served by an elementary school: Bench Elementary, Collettville Elementary and French Immersion, Central Elementary, Diamond Vale Elementary. Also, a high school, Merritt Secondary School, that services the area. The main office for School District 58 Nicola-Similkameen, which operates the schools in the area, is also located in Merritt. The town is also served by the Nicola Valley Museum and Archives.

Commerce and industry 

Today, ranching, farming, forestry, transportation and tourism are the primary industries. Merritt is the nearest large community to the Douglas Lake Cattle Company, Canada's largest working cattle ranch.

Merritt was once host to an annual Merritt Mountain Music Festival that is estimated to have drawn as many as 148,000 people at its peak in the summer of 2005. The Mountain Music Festival, combined with the development of the Merritt Walk of Stars - a display of bronzed handprints of Mountainfest artists placed around the community - the Mural Project, designed by artist Michelle Loughery, the Canadian Country Music Hall of Fame, Music in the Square and in the Park along with other tourism development activities have been used to solidify the city's branding as the Country Music Capital of Canada.

Merritt's prime location has provided the opportunity to host many events, the West Coast Rally Association's Pacific Forest Rally, an off-road rally conducted as part of the Canadian Rally Championship series every October, also the annual winter Thunderbird Rally often begins and ends in Merritt. The Bass Coast Festival held annually on the BC Day weekend and supports electronic music and creative arts draws attendees from all over North America. The annual Labour Day Rodeo and Fall Fair are long standing traditions in this ranching valley, drawing participants from all over Canada and the US.

As a filming location 

Merritt provided the backdrop for the Academy Award-nominated movie The Sweet Hereafter. The debut episode of Smallville was partly filmed on location in Merritt. Jack Nicholson's The Pledge and the 2006 remake of The Wicker Man were also filmed partly in the area. In 2013 Shana: The Wolf's Music directed by Nino Jacusso was released, it is a drama about a First Nations girl coming of age set in a First Nations location. Scheduled to be released theatrically on June 11, 2021 Jurassic World Dominion began filming on February 25, 2020 in Merritt and concluded in early March 2020, with the shoot including the city's downtown area.

The Nicola Valley is also host to the shooting of numerous commercials. Merritt is a member of the Thompson-Nicola Film Commission, which is a full-time, full service film commission representing the Thompson Nicola Regional District.

Music 

The Merritt Mountain Music Festival was an outdoor music festival in Merritt. In 2005 the festival hosted a record-breaking attendance of approximately 148,000 people throughout the six-day event. Over the years it has hosted country stars such as Kenny Chesney, Reba McEntire, and Wynonna Judd. Since cancelling the festival in the summer of 2012, The Merritt Mountain Music Festival is no longer in operation.

Starting on the BC Day weekend in 2013 (Friday, August 2 to Monday, August 5, 2013), Bass Coast Music Festival will be making Merritt, BC its new home (after taking place in Squamish, BC its first four years). Bass Coast features a wide variety of music "from daytime soul and reggae jams, to live experimental electronic music, house and techno".

2015 was the first year for the Rockin' River Music Fest, formerly held in Mission B.C., taking place July 30 to August 2. The return of a country music festival to Merritt was the first since the cancellation of the Merritt Mountain Music Festival in 2012. The 2015 headliners included Lady Antebellum.

Sports 

Merritt is home to the longest continuously run franchise in the British Columbia Hockey League, the Merritt Centennials. The Cents moved to the Nicola Valley from White Rock midway through the 1973–74 season. The Centennials play all home games at the city-run Nicola Valley Memorial Arena and their season runs from early September through early March.

Merritt also hosts the Nicola Valley Pro Rodeo on the Saturday and Sunday of Labour Day weekend every year.

Merritt is also home to the Nicola Valley Thunder minor lacrosse club.

A round of the Canadian Rally Championship, the Pacific Forest Rally, is held each year in and around Merritt. The international motorsport event is televised on TSN and RDS in Canada, and MotorsTV in Europe.

Merritt and the Nicola Valley features two golf courses, the Merritt Golf and Country Club in downtown Merritt and the Quilchena on the Lake Golf Course, located 15 minutes east of the city at historic Quilchena.

Merritt features a skateboard park, bike park, and numerous walking trails. It offers an abundance of camping, picnicking, swimming, fishing, boating, water-skiing, wind-surfing and hiking.

The Merritt Panthers high school teams compete in boys and girls volleyball, basketball, and rugby.

There is also a local slo-pitch softball league and the Merritt Otters swim club, which makes its home at the Nicola Valley Aquatic Centre.

Media 

Merritt is home to Q101 Merritt's Music Mix, the Nicola Valley's only local radio station. 101.1 FM, CKMQ-FM is locally owned and an independent radio station. Q101 also reports news and broadcasts the BCHL's Merritt Centennials hockey games.
The station was originally launched in 1970 on AM 1230 as CJNL. In 2009, Merritt Broadcasting Ltd. received CRTC approval to convert to the FM band, and the station was relaunched on 101.1 FM on August 31 of that year. Simultaneously, the company's former sister division, NL Broadcasting, received approval to launch a separate rebroadcaster of CHNL, the company's talk radio station in Kamloops, on CJNL's former AM frequency.

Merritt has a weekly newspaper, the Merritt Herald, that publishes on Thursdays. Merritt is also served by Shaw TV and by TELUS PureFibre Internet and Optik TV.

Demographics

Ethnicity

Religion 
According to the 2021 census, religious groups in Merritt included:
Irreligion (4,165 persons or 61.7%)
Christianity (2,225 persons or 33.0%)
Sikhism (185 persons or 2.7%)
Hinduism (40 persons or 0.6%)
Indigenous Spirituality (40 persons or 0.6%)
Buddhism (20 persons or 0.3%)
Other (50 persons or 0.7%)

Climate
Merritt has a humid continental climate (Dfb).

Surrounding communities

Notes

References

External links 

Cities in British Columbia
Nicola Country
Populated places in the Thompson-Nicola Regional District